Klaus Immer (9 March 1924 – 8 February 2022) was a German politician who served as a member of the Bundestag. He died in Altenkirchen on 8 February 2022, at the age of 97.

References

1924 births
2022 deaths
All-German People's Party politicians
Members of the Bundestag for Rhineland-Palatinate
Social Democratic Party of Germany politicians
People from Krummhörn